Seville is a census-designated place in Wilcox County, Georgia, United States. Per the 2020 census, the population was 197.

History
A post office called Seville was established in 1887. The name is a transfer from Seville, in Spain.

The Georgia General Assembly incorporated Seville as a town in 1890. The town's municipal charter was repealed in 1995.

Demographics

2020 census

Note: the US Census treats Hispanic/Latino as an ethnic category. This table excludes Latinos from the racial categories and assigns them to a separate category. Hispanics/Latinos can be of any race.

Education 
The Wilcox County School District holds pre-school to grade twelve, and consists of an elementary school, a middle school, and a high school. The district has 90 full-time teachers and over 1,439 students.

The schools, located in Rochelle, are:
Wilcox County Elementary School
Wilcox County Middle School
Wilcox County High School

References

Former municipalities in Georgia (U.S. state)
Unincorporated communities in Georgia (U.S. state)
Unincorporated communities in Wilcox County, Georgia
Populated places disestablished in 1995